Derrick Atterberry (born November 1, 1972) is a former American football defensive back who played one season with the Memphis Mad Dogs of the Canadian Football League. He played college football at Vanderbilt University and Patterson High School in Dayton, Ohio. He was also a member of the Nashville Kats of the Arena Football League.

References

External links
Just Sports Stats

Living people
1972 births
Players of American football from Dayton, Ohio
Players of Canadian football from Dayton, Ohio
American football defensive backs
Canadian football defensive backs
African-American players of American football
African-American players of Canadian football
Vanderbilt Commodores football players
Memphis Mad Dogs players
Nashville Kats players